A Chronicle of Amorous Accidents is a 1986 Polish drama film directed by Andrzej Wajda, starring Paulina Młynarska and Piotr Wawrzyńczak. It tells the story of two Polish adolescents who fall in love on the eve of World War II. The film is based on the novel of the same title by Tadeusz Konwicki. It premiered in Poland on 24 November 1986.

Cast
 Paulina Młynarska as Alina
 Piotr Wawrzyńczak as Witek
 Magdalena Wójcik as Zuza, Alina's colleague
 Bernadetta Machała as Greta, Engel's sister
 Dariusz Dobkowski as Engel
 Jarosław Gruda as Lowa
 Joanna Szczepkowska as Cecylia
 Gabriela Kownacka as Olimpia
 Krystyna Zachwatowicz as Witek's mother
 Bohdana Majda as Cecylia's and Olimpia's mother
 Adrianna Godlewska as Nałęczowa, Alina's mother

Production
Paulina Mlynarska was 14 years old when she played an erotic scene in this film. She said that she was under the influence of sedatives and alcohol administered to her by director Andrzej Wajda. This caused her a strong trauma with which she struggled for many years.

References

1980s teen drama films
1986 films
Films based on Polish novels
Films directed by Andrzej Wajda
Polish drama films
1980s Polish-language films
Polish World War II films
1986 drama films